Der König is a German television series.

See also
List of German television series

External links
 

German crime television series
1994 German television series debuts
1998 German television series endings
German-language television shows
Sat.1 original programming
1990s German police procedural television series